Lycanthropes is a 1991 role-playing game supplement published by Mayfair Games for Chill.

Contents
Lycanthropes is a sourcebook detailing lycanthropy for the Chill system.

Reviews
Dragon #186

References

Chill (role-playing game) supplements
Role-playing game supplements introduced in 1991